Dwight Alexander Foster (born 2 April 1957) is a Canadian former professional ice hockey player. He was drafted into the National Hockey League (NHL) in the first round, 16th overall in 1977 by the Boston Bruins. Besides Boston, he played for the Colorado Rockies, New Jersey Devils and Detroit Red Wings, before retiring in 1987 because of knee injuries.

Amateur career
Foster was born in Toronto, Ontario. As a youth, he played in the 1968 and 1969 Quebec International Pee-Wee Hockey Tournaments with minor ice hockey teams from Toronto.

While playing for the Kitchener Rangers, he led the tough Ontario Hockey League in scoring, Foster was a highly rated prospect going into the 1977 NHL Entry Draft. The New York Islanders seriously considered selecting him 15th overall, but settled on future Hall of Fame forward Mike Bossy instead. Foster was known as a strong defensive forward with marginal offensive ability (his OHL scoring title notwithstanding), while Bossy was a prolific scorer who was not very physical. In the end, Islanders coach Al Arbour convinced general manager Bill Torrey that he should pick Bossy, arguing that it was easier to teach a scorer how to check.

Foster went next to Boston. That same year, he helped Team Canada win the silver medal at the World Junior Championships.

Professional career

Boston Bruins
Foster's career got off to a great start when he scored a goal in his first NHL game but things came crashing down just 14-games into the season when he tore the cartilage in his left knee requiring season-ending surgery. The following year he boosted his games played to 44, with another 22 spent with the Bruins' American Hockey League (AHL) affiliate, the Rochester Americans. Foster had a hard time earning the trust of Bruins coach Don Cherry. While he dressed for all eleven playoff games that spring he was used sparingly, including a three-second appearance in Boston's Game 7 semifinal loss versus Montreal which ended their season. After splitting time between the NHL and the AHL his first three seasons, Foster finally earned a full-time job for the 1980–81 season and chipped in 24-goals and 52-points for the Bruins. Foster centered Bruins' top scorer Rick Middleton and veteran winger Stan Jonathan but the next year Foster signed a free agent contract with the Colorado Rockies that summer and left Boston.

Colorado Rockies/New Jersey Devils
As compensation to the Bruins for signing Foster, the Rockies agreed to a trade that sent their second round pick in the 1982 NHL Entry Draft to Boston along with the option to swap first round picks in 1982. The deal proved costly for Colorado when the Rockies finished in last place, gifting the Bruins the first overall draft pick, which they used to select Gord Kluzak.

Foster struggled in Colorado while battling shoulder and groin injuries that limited his effectiveness; his goal total dropped by half from the previous season and his 31-points placed him eighth on the team. The franchise relocated to New Jersey for the following season but after just four games with the newly minted New Jersey Devils, the organization cut their losses and he was traded to the Detroit Red Wings with the Devils receiving one US dollar in exchange.

Detroit Red Wings
Injuries continued to plague Foster with the Red Wings, but he did bounce back to score 17-goals his first year in Detroit, while being limited to 58 games. It would prove to be the high-water mark for games played during his time in Motown while he battled shoulder and knee injuries. During his fourth season with the Red Wings, he was shipped back to Boston in a late-season trade for Dave Donnelly.

Second stint with Boston
Foster was held off the score sheet in the 13-games he played for the Bruins to wrap up the 1985–86 season but he did chip in two points in three playoff games that spring.  He returned to the Bruins for the 1986–87 season but struggled with just four goals in 47-games and suffered yet another knee injury that required surgery. When the Bruins did not offer him a contract for the 1987-88 campaign, Foster retired, finishing with 274 points in 541 career games.

Personal life
Foster is a father of four: Dwayne, Peter, Alex and Genevieve. Foster's son Alex is also a professional ice hockey player. Foster's son Peter received a scholarship to the United States Air Force Academy as a goaltender and played for the Air Force Falcons for four years.

Career statistics

Regular season and playoffs

International

Team records
1976–77: Most points – Kitchener Rangers (143)
1976–77: Most assists – Kitchener Rangers (83)
All-time most points – Kitchener Rangers (382)
Most goals in a game – Kitchener Rangers 1976–77 (5)

References

External links

1957 births
Binghamton Dusters players
Boston Bruins draft picks
Boston Bruins players
Canadian ice hockey forwards
Colorado Rockies (NHL) players
Detroit Red Wings players
Houston Aeros draft picks
Ice hockey people from Toronto
Kitchener Rangers players
Living people
National Hockey League first-round draft picks
New Jersey Devils players
Rochester Americans players
Wichita Wind players